The women's 20 kilometres walk competition of the athletics events at the 2011 Pan American Games took place on the 23 of October at the Guadalajara Circuit and Route. The defending Pan American Games champion is Cristina López of El Salvador.

Records

Qualification standards
This event did not require any qualification standard be met.

Schedule

Abbreviations
All times shown are in hours:minutes:seconds

Results
17 athletes from 9 countries competed.

Final

References

Athletics at the 2011 Pan American Games
2011
2011 in women's athletics